Digital Unlocked is an initiative by Google in collaboration with the Indian School of Business and Ministry of Electronics and Information Technology to promote digital awareness and to help small scale businesses and startups to go digital in India. It was announced and launched by Google's CEO Sundar Pichai during his visit to India in January 2017.  Digital Unlocked is a training program for small and medium-size businesses in India to start using the Internet to expand their business. The programme is built across the different formats of online, offline and mobile. The Digital Unlocked's offline training is being conducted in partnership with Federation of Indian Chambers of Commerce & Industry and Indian School of Business.

The training program allows the users to set their own goals and then recommends the courses which will help them achieve their own set goals. After completing the goals, or in-between, the users can also choose to complete and learn other courses which are of interest to them. The courses cover a wide range of topics from using the opportunities which the digital media and world have to offer to the advanced tools which can help businesses in many ways. The training program also offer a Certification to those who complete all the courses and qualify in the final assessment.

Topics 
Following are the topics which are covered in the program.

See also
 List of Google tools and services
 Google Primer
 Digital India
Google Ads

References

External links
Digital Unlocked

Google services
Ministry of Communications and Information Technology (India)
Internet in India
Digital India initiatives